Max Thompson may refer to:

 Max Thompson (Medal of Honor) (1922–1996), United States Army soldier and Medal of Honor recipient
 Max Thompson (footballer, born 1956), English former footballer
 Max Thompson (skier) (born 1984), Canadian Nordic combined skier
 Max Thompson (footballer, born 2002), English footballer